Dedication is the third album of hardcore band Raised Fist.

Track listing

Get This Right! 3:30
That's Why 1:37
Message Beneath Contempt 3:20
The People Behind 2:16
Disable Me 4:58
Killing Revenues 2:59
Illustration of Desperation 4:13
Dedication 3:54
Silence Is the Key 2:08
Another Day 3:23
Between the Demons 3:06

Musicians

 Marco Eronen - Guitar
 Daniel Holmberg - Guitar
 Oskar Karlsson – drums
 Andreas "Josse" Johansson - Bass
 Alexander "Alle" Hagman - Vocals
 Gustav Jorde (Defleshed)– additional vocals on "Between the Demons"
 Örjan Örnkloo – additional guitars/samplings

2002 albums
Raised Fist albums
Burning Heart Records albums